The Samsung Galaxy TabPro S is a 12-inch Windows 10-based 2-in-1 PC produced and marketed by Samsung Electronics. It comes in a standard version and a Gold version. The TabPro S marked a departure from the traditionally Android-powered Galaxy lineup.

Release 

The TabPro S was unveiled at Consumer Electronics Show 2016 on Press Day at the Samsung Press Conference. It was released on March 18, 2016.

Features 

The tablet has a first-party keyboard attachment included. It is a folio keyboard, which means it can be in two different positions depending how the stand is set up. When closed, it has a leather-like texture to protect from normal wear and tear when traveling.

The USB Type-C Multi-port Adapter now integrates with USB-A 3.1 Port, HDMI Port and USB-C Port. It has a 128GB solid-state drive (256GB in the Gold version) and 4GB RAM (8GB in the Gold version).

The Galaxy TabPro Pen (not to be confused with the S-Pen, the traditional Samsung stylus) is a digital stylus pen that works as an input device for this Tablet. It features 1024 pressure levels. It can be seamlessly paired via Bluetooth. It uses rechargeable battery instead of disposable AAAA battery, which allows the digital stylus pen's battery to be recharged via Micro USB 2.0 Port. the initial charge last up to 30 days.

Samsung Flow is the fingerprint access application. It can also be paired with a phone via Bluetooth and NFC tag. With this, users can unlock the tablet with their phone's fingerprint sensor.

Although the Samsung Galaxy Book was unveiled at MWC 2017, and features several improvements over the TabPro S model, it is not considered a direct successor.

See also
 Samsung Galaxy Tab Pro
 Samsung Galaxy Book

References

External links
 

Samsung Galaxy Tab series